The Russian Empire competed at the 1900 Summer Olympics in Paris.  It was the first appearance of the European nation, which had entered the names of competitors for the first modern Olympics in 1896 but had failed to appear.

Results by event

Equestrian

The Russian team had two riders in the initial Olympic equestrian competitions. Both men competed in the long jump and in the mail coach and de Polyakov competed in the hacks and hunter combined event. One of the two competed in the high jump, though it is not clear which. Similarly, it is not clear which of the two men entered the jumping competition; further, for this event, it is not clear whether the Russian entrant actually competed.

Fencing

Russia competed in fencing in the nation's first Olympic appearance.  The nation sent 3 fencers; all were sabre professionals. Only two competed.

Notes

References
 De Wael, Herman. Herman's Full Olympians: "Equestrian 1900". Accessed 19 January 2006.
 

Nations at the 1900 Summer Olympics
1900
Olympics
Sport in the Russian Empire